In the history of mathematics, Alfred Tarski (1901–1983) is one of the most important logicians. His name is now associated with a number of theorems and concepts in that field.

Theorems 

Łoś–Tarski preservation theorem
 Knaster–Tarski theorem (sometimes referred to as Tarski's fixed point theorem)
 Tarski's undefinability theorem
 Tarski–Seidenberg theorem
 Some fixed point theorems, usually variants of the Kleene fixed-point theorem, are referred to the Tarski–Kantorovitch fixed–point principle or the Tarski–Kantorovitch theorem although the use of this terminology is limited.
 Tarski's theorem

Other mathematics-related work 

 Bernays-Tarski axiom system
 Banach–Tarski paradox
 Lindenbaum–Tarski algebra
 Łukasiewicz-Tarski logic
 Jónsson–Tarski duality
 Jónsson–Tarski algebra
 Gödel–McKinsey–Tarski translation
 The semantic theory of truth is sometimes referred to as Tarski's definition of truth or Tarski's truth definitions.
 Tarski's axiomatization of the reals
 Tarski's axioms for plane geometry
 Tarski's circle-squaring problem
 Tarski's exponential function problem
 Tarski–Grothendieck set theory
 Tarski's high school algebra problem
 Tarski–Kuratowski algorithm
 Tarski monster group
 Tarski's plank problem
 Tarski's problems for free groups
 Tarski–Vaught test
 Tarski's World

Other 
 13672 Tarski, a main-belt asteroid

Tarski